Events from the year 1585 in India.

Events
 Princely state of Chitral established

Births

Deaths

See also

 Timeline of Indian history